The Ludwik Rydygier Collegium Medicum in Bydgoszcz is an extension of the Nicolaus Copernicus University in Toruń (UMK), aimed at training students in medical sciences.

The Toruń University ranking among the other Polish faculties is the following:
 9th according to the CWTS Leiden Ranking (2020);
 10th according to the URAP (2020-2021).

Characteristics 
The Collegium Medicum is a separate branch of the "Nicolaus Copernicus University" in Toruń located in Bydgoszcz: with three faculties it provides education in eleven departments with several specialties within these departments. 
Two University Hospitals of Bydgoszcz are associated with the Collegium Medicum: 
 No. 1-Dr. Antoni Jurasz;
 No. 2-Dr. Jan Biziel.  

Furthermore, the institution operates other centers in the city:
 the Oncology Center-Prof. Franciszek Łukaszczyk;
 the Hospice-Blessed Father Jerzy Popiełuszko;
 the Kujawsko-Pomorskie Pulmonology Center;
 the Hospital for Infectious Diseases-Tadeusz Browicz in Świętego Floriana Street.
and also facilities in Toruń:
 the provincial Hospital-Ludwik Rydygier;
 the provincial Children's Hospital.
Additionally, the university conducts teaching activities at the 10th Military Hospital in Bydgoszcz.

The Collegium Medicum manages two university dormitories: one downtown, at 13 Jagiellońska street and one in the eastern district of Fordon at Bartłomieja z Bydgoszczy street.

The instruction is organized according to the three stages of the European Higher Education Area (EHEA) : 
 undergraduate studies;
 MA degree studies;
 doctorate studies-Faculty of Medicine/Faculty of Health Sciences;
 There are also opportunities to conduct postgraduate studies.

In 2020/2021, 4870 students study at the Collegium Medicum, including 551 doctorates and more than 300 foreigners (mainly from Norway, Ireland, The Netherlands).
The same academic year, 857 teachers were employed at the Collegium Medicum, comprising 188 professors or habilitated doctors and 5 assistant professors. The university employees in Bydgoszcz represent nearly a third of the overall UMK personnel and a third of the UMK students are  working in Bydgoszcz.

In addition to a large spectrum of activities (teaching, education, research and development), the medical university conducts highly specialized therapeutic tasks for the entire Voivodeship.

Collegium Medicum takes part in many international research and teaching programs, organizing national and international academic conferences. Regular  scientific contacts are exchanged with other centers in Germany (Wuppertal, Berlin, Kiel), Switzerland (Aarau), Netherlands (Amsterdam), France (Paris), Sweden (Lund), Norway (Sandvik), Belgium (Antwerp, Liège) and United States (Houston).

The university also conducts operations for the local community, such as the medical science festival "Medicalia" organized periodically at the end of the year in Bydgoszcz.

In 1991, the UMK-Collegium Medicum was registered into the World Health Organization database.

History

Department of Physicians' Development
The origin of Bydgoszcz Medical Academy, present day UMK-Collegium Medicum, dates back to 1951, when was set up in the city the first "Department of Physicians' Development" in Poland: it was housed by the University Hospital No. 1-"Antoni Jurasz". 

In 1953, the "Institute of Improvement and Specialization of Medical Personnel", today's Medical Center of Postgraduate Education, was established in Warsaw: nine of its clinical and diagnostic units were located in the provincial hospitals of Bydgoszcz. During 4 years (1953–1957), the local branch of the Institute was chaired by prof. Jan Szymański, his successor was prof. Jan Małecki.

In 1959, the Institute was transformed into a "Medical Training Center" and incorporated in the Medical University of Warsaw. At that time, the 2nd clinic of otorhinolaryngology was established in Bydgoszcz and the postgraduate training of doctors in other medical disciplines was entrusted to the heads of hospital departments. A year later, the Provincial Council in Bydgoszcz adopted a resolution to establish a Medical University in Bydgoszcz, using the basis of the "Physician Improvement Study Department". This decision was reached with the consent of the representatives of the "Nicolaus Copernicus University in Toruń" and the minister of higher education.

In 1962, the same assembly allocated to the nascent university buildings at 30 Chodkiewicza street (which are today the seat of the UKW) as well as other buildings that were under then the property of the University of Technology and Life Sciences and the Institutes of Agriculture.

In the 1960s, however, the university could not yet be established as it had too few independent research workers. At last by 1970, five doctors and one pharmacist obtained their postdoctoral habilitation and over twenty scholars got their Doctorate of medicine. These nominations helped to create what would become the nucleus of the medical university teaching team.

Clinical Teaching Team 
In 1971, a faculty of medicine from the Medical University of Gdańsk was established in Bydgoszcz, as  a Clinical Teaching Team, for 5th-year students. At the same time, in 1972 a "Pharmaceutical Study" was set up by the "Warsaw Medical Center of Postgraduate Education", aiming at training pharmacists from all over the country. In 1974, full-time studies for 5th-year were introduced and a House of Science was erected, housing dormitory for students and apartments for academic teachers.

On September 1, 1975, an additional branch of the Gdańsk Medical University was established, which extended the education also to the fourth year pupils.  In 1977, a building for the Department of Pathomorphology and Forensic Medicine was commissioned. In 1979, a second faculty of Medicine was created in Bydgoszcz by the Medical University of Gdańsk. The Ministry of Health allowed the tentative build-up of an integrated medicine course (from the first year on) in Bydgoszcz, under the patronage and via the financial aid of the WHO. To this goal, the provincial authorities handed over in 1980, a building to house six theoretical facilities. However, the political situation at the time thwarted these efforts.
Nevertheless, this very year was signed the commission for the building of the future "University Hospital nr.2".

Medical University of Bydgoszcz 
In 1984, a Medical University was opened in Bydgoszcz, on the model of the Faculty of Medicine in Gdańsk. Its teaching team was led by:

 prof. dr Jan Domaniewski as rector;
 prof. dr Bogdan Romański, dr. Zygmunt Mackiewicz and dr. Stanisław Betlejewski as vice-rectors;
 dr Anna Balcar-Boroń as dean.
The same year, by the decision of the Minister of Health, a Department of Pharmacy was also established in the city.

At that time, the Faculty of Medicine had been operating 15 clinics and 13 dispensaries. The staff consisted of 189 academic teachers including 6 professors and 12 docents. In 1985, the academy took over the management of the "Hospital No. 2" (renamed after Dr. Jan Biziel in 1992), transforming it into a teaching hospital. Simultaneously, buildings for theoretical teachings of 1st- and 2nd years were completed and a further expansion of the "University Hospital No. 1-Dr. Antoni Jurasz" was under way.

The Faculty of Medicine got the right to confer 
 doctor of medical sciences degrees in the field of medicine (1986) and medical biology (1987);
 habilitations of medical sciences in the field of medicine and Medical biology (1987).
In 1987, the Faculty of Pharmacy including a department of Laboratory diagnostics was launched.

On January 31, 1989, the Medical Academy in Bydgoszcz was named after Ludwik Rydygier. The university also received the responsibility of the "University Hospital No. 1-Dr. Antoni Jurasz", where new clinics and departments were opened. A surgery Department and Clinic was also established in Toruń.

In 1990, the Medical Academy purchased the building at 13 Jagiellońska street from the former Provincial Committee of the PZPR: there were located the offices of the rector and the dean, faculties of Medicine and Pharmacy, the university administration, lecture rooms, a canteen and an additional dormitory. In 1992,  at the Ciechocinek Health Resort Hospital were opened a chair and a clinic of balneotherapy and Metabolism Diseases.

In 1994, the growing Medical University numbered 445 academic teachers including 48 professors, associate professors and habilitated doctors. Students were educated within two faculties comprising two departments. In 1996, the Psychiatry and Clinic division moved to a facility at Kurpiński street and an Intercollegiate Center of Medical Physics was established. Two years later, a "Nursing Department" was established as well as a new building for Rehabilitation medicine and a modern facility at the Clinical Hospital. In 1999, a doctorate studies cycle opened and a teaching center of the nursing faculty set up in Włocławek.

In 2000, the Faculty of Nursing became the "Faculty of Nursing and Health Sciences", introducing the study of public health with three specialties:
 emergency medicine a pioneering field in Poland;
 dietetics;
 health care organization and management. The latter was established in cooperation with the private "University of Management and Finance in Bydgoszcz".

In 2001, the Faculty of Pharmacy introduced specializations of the medical analytics curriculum: biotechnology (the second opening in this area in the country) and biomedicine IT. The Polish Ministry of Health awarded the Medical University of Bydgoszcz with the highest evaluation of all medical academies in Poland. In 2002, the Clinical Hospital capacity was significantly expanded by the commissioning of a 10-level building. In 2004, the university completed the renovation of the edifice at 20 Świętojańska street, donated by the city authorities to research and teaching units.

In the 2000s, scientific research conducted by the institution focused on various domains: neoplasm, injury and their consequences for the body, cardiovascular diseases, allergic diseases, alcohol, nicotine and drug addictions,  family health protection, molecular biology and genetics. In addition, many unique research works have been carried out in the field of medicine  and medical biology.

In 2004, the Medical University in Bydgoszcz had 115 scientific and didactic organizational units, including 44 at the Faculty of Medicine, 23 at the Faculty of Pharmacy, 42 at the Faculty of Health Sciences and 6 inter-department bodies. The teaching personnel comprised 551 academic teachers among which 113 independent research and teaching staff, 91 professors and 21 doctors. Since 1998, seven people have been made Honorary degree doctors. In 2004, 3720 pupils were studying at the university, more than at the Medical University of Łódź or the Medical Academies of Szczecin, Białystok and Gdańsk.

Collegium Medicum UMK in Bydgoszcz 
On October 14, 2003, the council of the Medical Academy in Bydgoszcz agreed upon the merge with the Nicolaus Copernicus University in Toruń (UMK), which was ratified by the UMK leading body on October 28. A prerequisite condition was for the medical university to keep its own naming/patron and its own seat in Bydgoszcz. The unification was officially endorsed on November 24, 2004, by a bill from the Sejm, the Senate and the signature of the President of Poland: the Medical University in Bydgoszcz was incorporated into the UKM as the "Collegium Medikum-Ludwik Rydygier" in Bydgoszcz. The previous rector of the university became the vice-rector of the Toruń University in charge of the Collegium Medicum (CM). Three faculties belonging to the CM in Bydgoszcz are an integral part of the UKM but keep at the same time a granted  autonomy, which allows for instance the possibility of an independent conduct of the personnel policy by the Vice-Rector for CM within a separate budget.

In 2006, new headquarters of the Pharmacy Faculty were unveiled at Jurasza street and in 2009 an expansion to the "University Hospital No. 1-Dr. Antoni Jurasz" started. Several buildings previously owned by the city were transformed, such as in Świętojańska and Sandomierska streets. Between 2007 and 2011, three new departments were opened, dietetics, obstetrics and emergency medicine. 
The university launched the first bone marrow transplant center in northern Poland at the Department Clinic of Pediatrics, Hematology and Oncology. The Collegium Medicum cooperates to the work aimed at creating a Regional Center for Telemedicine at the "University Hospital No. 1-Dr. Antoni Jurasz".

In October 2013, the former Prussian Eastern Railway Headquarters located at 63 Dworcowa Street was handed over to the CM UMK in order to install a dentistry faculty. The project is still on hold, as the necessary renovations to adapt and equip the building to the needs of the university are too expensive for its budget (about 30 million zł).

In 2019, an architectural competition was announced to develop an architectural concept for the expansion of the research and teaching facility in the area delineated by Jurasza, Marii Skłodowskiej Curie streets and Cardinal Wyszyńskiego, Powstańców Wielkopolskich avenues.

In 2020, the CM employed over 1,400 personnel (including more than 850 academic teachers) and taught nearly 5,000 students in three faculties: Medicine, Pharmacy and Health Sciences.

Collegium Medicum UMK also offers English studies based on the Polish curriculum: hence the institution welcomed in 2020 around 300 students, mainly from Ireland, Great Britain, Denmark, Italy, Sweden, Norway, Spain, Saudi Arabia, United States, Canada, India and Thailand.

UMK status of "research university" was awarded as one of 10 Polish universities in the competition of the Ministry of Science and Higher Education "Initiative of Excellence - Research University" performed on October 30, 2019.

Each year Collegium Medicum UMK participates in international scientific and didactic programs. As of 2021, the university has joined the following platforms:
 Erasmus +, allowing the teaching staff, students and administrative employees to take part in foreign studies or internships in European countries (e.g. Spain, Portugal, France, Turkey, Finland, Sweden, Norway, Romania, Bulgaria, Slovakia, Czech Republic, Slovenia, Italy, Germany, Macedonia);
 Project "Better treatments for breathlessness in palliative and end of life care (Better-B)" under the "EU Framework Programme Horizon 2020";
 Project "Strategic Innovative Educational Network for Healthy Aging".

Doctoral students syllabus, established on May 28, 2019, is also very dynamic. The Doctoral School educates doctoral students in 3 scientific disciplines: pharmaceutical sciences, medical sciences and health sciences. Doctoral students are as well the organizers of the "iMEDIC" (International Medical Interdisciplinary Congress), a professional forum of researchers, where they can share their works and achievements, and expand their knowledge in the field of broadly understood medical sciences.

Organisation
The structure of the Collegium Medicum is organized by faculty and departments, as well as theoretical departments.

Faculty of Medicine
The Faculty of Medicine was founded in 1984. It is located at 13 Jagiellońska street.
The current dean is prof. dr hab. Zbigniew Włodarczyk (May 2021). The faculty is constructed around the following departments or chairs:

Faculty of Pharmacy
The Faculty of Pharmacy was founded in 1989. It is located at 15 Jagiellońska street.
The current dean is prof. dr hab. Stefan Kruszewski (May 2021). The faculty is constructed around the following departments or chairs:

Faculty of Health Sciences
The Faculty of Health Sciences was founded in 1997. It is located at 15 Jagiellońska street.
The current dean is prof. dr hab. Alina Borkowska (May 2021). The faculty is constructed around the following departments or chairs:

Other units
 Archives of the UMK - Branch of Bydgoszcz
 Medical Library
 Center for Specialist Languages in Medicine
 Center of Education in English at Collegium Medicum UMK
 Medical Simulation Center 
 Clinical Communication Center
 Unit of Physical Education and Sport 
 Independent institution for Animal Experiments
 Bioethical commission

Buildings

Teaching facilities and administrative buildings

Hospitals and clinics

Honoris causa doctors
The former "Medical Academy in Bydgoszcz" granted the title of "doctor" honoris causa to the following people:
 Prof. Jean Daniel Picard (1927-2013) in 1998, a French vascular radiologist and surgeon;
 Prof. dr. hab. Stefan Raszeja (1922-2021) in 1998, a Polish forensic doctor, professor, rector of the Medical University of Gdańsk from 1972 to 1975;
 Dr. Miral Dizdaroglu in 2000;
 Prof. dr. hab. Bogdan Romański (1920-2002) in 2001, specialized in allergology. A commemorative plaque has been unveiled in 2011 in his honor at the CM UMK.
 Prof. dr. Jean Natali (1921-2012)  in 2001, a French physician in vascular surgery and phlebology;
 Prof. dr. hab. Tadeusz Pisarski (1927-2010) in 2002, a gynecologist from Poznań;
 Prof. Lars Norgren in 2003, a Swedish vascular surgeon;
 Prof. dr. hab. Jan Domaniewski (1928-2009) in 2004, a Polish physician specialized in Anatomical pathology;
 Prof. dr. hab. Adam Bilikiewicz (1933-2007) in 2004, a Polish psychiatrist, president of the "Polish Psychiatric Association".

Since 2004, the title of "doctor" honoris causa of the UMK has been granted to the following notables:
 Pope John Paul II in 2004; 
 Tomas Venclova in 2005;
 Prof. dr. hab. Bohdan Paczyński in 2006;
 Valdas Adamkus in 2007; 
 Prof. dr. hab. Mietek Jaroniec in 2009; 
 Prof. dr. hab. Janusz Stanisław Trzciński in 2010, a Polish lawyer, constitutionalist, professor of legal sciences; 
 Prof. Peter Norman Wilkinson in 2010, a British Professor of Radio Astronomy; 
 Prof. dr. hab. Andrzej Bogusławski in 2012; 
 Prof. dr. hab. Zygmunt Mackiewicz (1931-2015) in 2013, a Polish surgeon, president of the "Society of Polish Surgeons" (1997–1999) and co-founder of the Medical Academy- "Ludwik Rydygier" in Bydgoszcz; 
 Prof. James G. Fujimoto in 2015;
 Prof. Paul Alfred Gurbel in 2016, an American cardiologist; 
 Prof. Ernst Frideryk Konrad Koerner in 2016;
 Prof. dr. hab. Andrzej Cichocki in 2018, a Polish doctor of Science degree in Electrical Engineering and Computer Science; 
 Prof. Robert Fry Engle in 2018;
 Prof. Stefan Gierowski in 2019; 
 Prof. Norman Davies in 2019.

See also
 Ludwik Rydygier
 List of universities in Poland
 Medical University of Gdańsk

External links

Students associations
  CM UMK students council
  Academy Rescue Group
  Student Science association
  Student association of laboratory diagnostics
  Polish association of pharmacy students
  Choir of the CM UMK
  Academic Sport Union
  Film Club CM UMK
  International association of medicine students (IFMSA)-Bydgoszcz Branch
  Cosmetology Student organization
  Independent association of students of the UMK-Bydgoszcz branch

Other links
  Careers at CM UMK
 10th Military Hospital
  Bydgoszcz oncologic hospital
  Pulmonary care hospital
  University Hospital Nr.1-"Dr. Antoni Jurasz"
  University Hospital Nr.2-"Dr. Jan Biziel"
 Project "BETTER TREATMENTS FOR BREATHLESSNESS IN PALLIATIVE AND END OF LIFE CARE"
 Project "Strategic Innovative Educational Network for Healthy Aging"

References

Bibliography
  
  
  
  
  
  
  

Schools in Bydgoszcz
Universities and colleges in Bydgoszcz
Medical schools in Poland